The berylline hummingbird (Saucerottia beryllina) is a species of hummingbird in the "emeralds", tribe Trochilini of subfamily Trochilinae. It is found in El Salvador, Guatemala, Honduras, Mexico, and the United States.

Taxonomy and systematics

The berylline hummingbird was formerly placed in the genus Amazilia. A molecular phylogenetic study published in 2014 found that the genus Amazilia was polyphyletic. In the revised classification to create monophyletic genera, the berylline hummingbird was moved by most taxonomic systems to the resurrected genus Saucerottia. However, BirdLife International's Handbook of the Birds of the World retains it in Amazilia.

The berylline hummingbird has these five subspecies:

S. b. viola (Miller, W, 1905)
S. b. beryllina (Deppe, 1830)
S. b. lichtensteini (Moore, RT, 1950)
S. b. sumichrasti (Salvin, 1891)
S. b. devillei (Bourcier & Mulsant, 1848)

Description

The bills of males of all subspecies have a black maxilla and a pinkish mandible with a black outer half. Adult males of the nominate subspecies S. b. beryllina have a bronze-green to coppery head, back and rump. Their uppertail coverts and tail are coppery to rufous. The bases of their primaries and secondaries are chestnut and show as a patch on the closed wing. Their underparts are glittering golden green. Adult nominate females are very similar to males, but with a paler and more grayish throat and belly. Their bills are entirely black. Juveniles are similar to females but with a grayish cinnamon belly.

Subspecies S. b. viola has a grayish tinge on its back and rump, a fawn to cinnamon belly, and dark violet uppertail coverts and tail. S. b. lichtensteini is overall a lighter green than the nominate and its tail is silvery. S. b. sumichrasti males have duller green plumage than the nominate and a purplish gloss to the tail. Females' central tail feathers have a silvery to purple cast. S. b. devillei has more bronze on the back and rump than the nominate and a purplish to bronzy chestnut tail.

Distribution and habitat

The subspecies of berylline hummingbird are found thus:

S. b. viola, in western Mexico from Sonora to Michoacán and Guerrero and rarely to the southwestern US.
S. b. beryllina, central Mexico from México state south into Veracruz and Oaxaca
S. b. lichtensteini, western Chiapas in southern Mexico
S. b. sumichrasti, extreme southeastern Oaxaca and northern and central Chiapas in southern Mexico
S. b. devillei, discontinuously from the other subspecies in southern Guatemala and through El Salvador into central Honduras.

The berylline hummingbird primarily inhabits arid landscapes. The wide variety includes dense oak and pine-oak forest, scrublands, deciduous and thorn forest, gallery forest, plantations, and parks and gardens.

Behavior

Movement

The berylline hummingbird has movements that vary with geography. It is sedentary in most of its range except the far north, where it migrates southward for winter. It increasingly has wandered and sometimes bred in southeastern Arizona and has occurred in southwestern New Mexico and western Texas. Even in the bulk of its range it appears to make some seasonal elevational changes.

Feeding

The berylline hummingbird is a generalist, foraging for nectar at a wide variety of flowering plants both native and introduced. It feeds at all levels of the forest. Though it will congregate with other hummingbird species at flowering trees, it tends to be dominant over most and often defends feeding territories. In addition to nectar it feeds on arthropods captured by hawking from a perch or picking from spider webs.

Breeding

In Oaxaca the berylline hummingbird breeds between June and October with a peak in September; its breeding season in the rest of its range has not been defined. It makes a solid cup nest of grass and other plant fibers bound with spiderweb with lichens on the outside. The female incubates the clutch of two eggs; the incubation period has not been determined. Fledging occurs about 20 days after hatch.

Vocalization

The berylline hummingbird's song is somewhat variable, "slightly gruff, high-pitched twittering notes [with] lisping introductory notes...rendered 'ssi kirr-i-rr kirr-i-rr', 'sirrr, ki-ti ki-dik' or 'sssi-ir sssiir chit-chit chit-chit-chit...'." It also makes calls that are described as "a hard, buzzy 'dzzzzir' or 'drrzzzt', and a more liquid 'dzzzzrrt' that may be repeated several times".

Status

The IUCN has assessed the berylline hummingbird as being of Least Concern. It has a large range and a stable population of about two million mature individuals. No immediate threats have been identified. It varies from uncommon to common in Mexico and south but is very local and rare in the US.

References

External links 
 Berylline hummingbird photo; Article state.tx.us
 Article Oiseaux

Saucerottia
Birds of Mexico
Birds of Central America
Birds of El Salvador
Birds of Guatemala
Birds of Honduras
Hummingbird species of Central America
Birds described in 1830
Taxobox binomials not recognized by IUCN